Luke Fritz (born August 10, 1978) is a former professional American and Canadian football offensive tackle who last played for the Winnipeg Blue Bombers of the Canadian Football League. He was signed by the Carolina Panthers as an undrafted free agent in 2001 after being chosen by the Montreal Alouettes in the first round of the 2001 CFL Draft. He played college football for the Eastern Washington Eagles. He was a member of the 2002 Alouettes Grey Cup championship team.

His brother Mitch was a hockey player, playing in the ECHL, AHL, and the NHL, where he played 20 games for the New York Islanders in 2008-2009, registering no points and 42 penalty minutes.

External links
Winnipeg Blue Bombers bio

1978 births
Living people
American football offensive tackles
Canadian football offensive linemen
Canadian players of American football
Carolina Panthers players
Eastern Washington Eagles football players
Montreal Alouettes players
Players of Canadian football from British Columbia
Scottish Claymores players
Winnipeg Blue Bombers players
People from Osoyoos